Rhinosolea microlepidota is a species of sole native to the Pacific Ocean from around the Ryukyu Islands.  This species grows to a length of  SL.  This species is the only known member of its genus.

References
 

Soleidae
Taxa named by Henry Weed Fowler
Fish of Japan
Endemic fauna of Japan
Monotypic fish genera
Monotypic marine fish genera
Monotypic ray-finned fish genera